Kazuaki Ichikawa (born 12 October 1949) is a Japanese luger. He competed at the 1972 Winter Olympics and the 1976 Winter Olympics.

References

1949 births
Living people
Japanese male lugers
Olympic lugers of Japan
Lugers at the 1972 Winter Olympics
Lugers at the 1976 Winter Olympics
Sportspeople from Hokkaido